Rozelle is a given name. Notable people with the given name include:

Rozelle Claxton (1913–1995), American jazz pianist
Rozelle Gayle (1919–1986), American jazz pianist, comic entertainer and actor
Rozelle Scheepers (born 1974), South African cricketer

See also
Rozelle (surname)